is a Japanese voice actress and singer from Nagano Prefecture affiliated with the talent agency Difference. She became a voice actress after passing an audition organized by talent agency S-inc. She officially transferred to Difference on 1 September 2017. Some of her major roles are Honoka Kōsaka in Love Live! and Tokoha Anjō in Cardfight!! Vanguard G. She made her anime voice acting debut as Ricca Morizono in Da Capo III. She made an appearance at the Bangkok Comic Con in July 2014.

Career
In September 2014, she had her debut as a solo singer with the release of her first single.

In February 2015, Nitta's talent agency announced she would be suspending activities for two months to receive treatment for her vocal cord polyps. She returned to work mid-April after non-invasive treatment.

Personal life
Nitta was born in Nagano Prefecture. As well as singing, she also plays the piano. Her hobbies include visiting cafes, karaoke, and studying dinosaurs.

Filmography

Anime television

Uta no Prince-sama (2011), Female high school student (ep 1); Girl (ep 3)
T.P. Sakura - Time Paladin Sakura (2011), Kotori Shirakawa
Horizon in the Middle of Nowhere (2011), Malga Naruze
Horizon in the Middle of Nowhere II (2012), Malga Naruze
Da Capo III (2013), Ricca Morizono
I Couldn't Become a Hero, So I Reluctantly Decided to Get a Job. (2013), Elsa Crucial
Love Live! School Idol Project (2013), Honoka Kōsaka
Love Live! School Idol Project 2nd Season (2014), Honoka Kōsaka
Locodol (2014), Miyako Mima
Cardfight!! Vanguard G (2014), Tokoha Anjou
Tantei Opera Milky Holmes TD (2015), Marine Amagi
My Monster Secret (2015), Akari Kōmoto
Cardfight!! Vanguard G: GIRS Crisis (2015), Tokoha Anjou
Cardfight!! Vanguard G: Stride Gate (2016), Tokoha Anjou
Phantasy Star Online 2: The Animation (2016), Silva
Caligula (2018), Sweet-P
Okojo to Yamane (2018), Okojo
Irodorimidori (2022), Serina Akesaka

Dubbing roles  
Arctic Dogs, Jade (original voice: Heidi Klum)
Blanka (2017), Blanka (Cydel Gabutero)
Deep (2018), Alice (Lindsey Alena)
Down a Dark Hall, Catherine "Kit" (AnnaSophia Robb)
Help, I Shrunk My Parents, Ella Borsig (Lina Hüesker)
Help, I Shrunk My Teacher, Ella Borsig (Lina Hüesker)
The House of Magic (2019), Thunder (Brianne Siddall)
Jack and the Cuckoo-Clock Heart, Miss Acacia
Just a Breath Away, Anna (Olga Kurylenko) 
My Fair Lady (2017), Yoo Geum-bi (Heo Jung-eun)
My Only One, Kim Do-ran (Uee)
The Nut Job 2: Nutty by Nature, Andie (original voice: Katherine Heigl)
The Breadwinner, Parvana / Aatish (original voice: Saara Chaudry)
The Legend of 1900 (2020 Blu-Ray edition), The Girl (Mélanie Thierry)
A Discovery of Witches (2021), Miriam Shephard (Aiysha Hart)
The Father (2021), Laura/Lucy (Imogen Poots)
Littlest Pet Shop (2022), Pepper Clark (Tabitha St. Germain)
The Gilded Age (2022), Peggy Scott (Denée Benton)

Movies 
 Love Live! The School Idol Movie (2015), Honoka Kōsaka

Theatre
Legally Blonde (2017-2019), Vivienne Kensington

Video games
T.P. Sakura - Time Paladin Sakura (2011), Kotori Shirakawa
Fairy Fencer F (2013), Ethil
The Guided Fate Paradox (2013), Kuroiel Ryusaki (Credited as "Honoka Kōsaka")
Ring Dream Joshi Pro-Wres Taisen (2013), Mutsumi Sawa
Love Live! School Idol Paradise, (2013), Honoka Kōsaka
Love Live! School Idol Festival (2013)), Honoka Kōsaka
Atsumete! Trump Musume Reaction (2014), narration
Ayakashi Gohan (2014), Momo
Uchi no Hime-sama ga Ichiban Kawaii (2014), Princess Lilico
Girls × Magic (2014), Sakura Aoyagi
Sky Lore (2014), Olivia
Robot Girls Z Online (2014), Liking
Chaos Rings III (ケイオスリングス Keiosu Ringusu III) (2014), (Singer)Stella Glow (2015), MordimortCaligula (2016), Sweet-PSuperdimension Neptune vs. Sega Hard Girls (2016), SegamiLove Live! School Idol Festival All Stars'' (2019), Honoka Kōsaka

Discography

Albums

Singles

Live concerts

References

External links
 
Official agency profile 
 

1985 births
Living people
Anime singers
Japanese women pop singers
Japanese video game actresses
Japanese voice actresses
Music YouTubers
Musicians from Nagano Prefecture
Μ's members
Video game musicians
Voice actresses from Nagano Prefecture
21st-century Japanese actresses
21st-century Japanese women singers
21st-century Japanese singers
Japanese YouTubers